Gilberto Brown (born December 2, 1973) is a boxer who represents the United States Virgin Islands. He competed in the men's middleweight event at the 1992 Summer Olympics.

References

External links
 

1973 births
Living people
United States Virgin Islands male boxers
Olympic boxers of the United States Virgin Islands
Boxers at the 1992 Summer Olympics
Competitors at the 1990 Central American and Caribbean Games
Central American and Caribbean Games bronze medalists for the United States Virgin Islands
Place of birth missing (living people)
Middleweight boxers
Central American and Caribbean Games medalists in boxing